Elections to Antrim District Council were held on 30 May 1973 on the same day as the other Northern Irish local government elections. The election used three district electoral areas to elect a total of 15 councillors.

Election results

Districts summary

|- class="unsortable" align="centre"
!rowspan=2 align="left"|Ward
! % 
!Cllrs
! % 
!Cllrs
! %
!Cllrs
! %
!Cllrs
! %
!Cllrs
!rowspan=2|TotalCllrs
|- class="unsortable" align="center"
!colspan=2 bgcolor="" | UUP
!colspan=2 bgcolor="" | Alliance
!colspan=2 bgcolor="" | Vanguard
!colspan=2 bgcolor="" | DUP
!colspan=2 bgcolor="white"| Others
|-
|align="left"|Area A
|32.2
|2
|7.7
|0
|0.0
|0
|16.2
|1
|bgcolor="DDDDDD"|43.9
|bgcolor="DDDDDD"|2
|5
|-
|align="left"|Area B
|bgcolor="40BFF5"|72.9
|bgcolor="40BFF5"|4
|12.1
|1
|0.0
|0
|0.0
|0
|15.0
|0
|5
|-
|align="left"|Area C
|bgcolor="40BFF5"|46.1
|bgcolor="40BFF5"|3
|26.3
|1
|15.9
|1
|0.0
|0
|11.7
|0
|5
|-
|- class="unsortable" class="sortbottom" style="background:#C9C9C9"
|align="left"| Total
|49.4
|9
|16.1
|2
|6.1
|1
|5.3
|1
|23.1
|2
|15
|-
|}

Districts results

Area A

1973: 2 x UUP, 1 x DUP, 1 x Independent, 1 x Independent Nationalist

Area B

1973: 4 x UUP, 1 x Alliance

Area C

1973: 3 x UUP, 1 x Alliance, 1 x Vanguard

References

Antrim Borough Council elections
Antrim